Patrick Roy (born 1965) is a former Canadian hockey goaltender.

Patrick Roy may also refer to:

Patrick Roy (politician) (1957–2011), French politician
Patrick Roy (TV presenter) (1952–1993), French television animator